Clothing in Afghanistan consists of the traditional style of clothing worn in Afghanistan. The various cultural exchanges in the nation's history have influenced the styles and flavors of contemporary Afghan designs. The national dress is the fusion of different ethnic groups in Afghanistan.  The styles can be subdivided into the various ethnicities with unique elements for each. Traditional dresses for both men and women tend to cover the whole body, with trousers gathered at the waist, a loose shirt or dress, and some form of head covering.

Men's clothing
The perahan tunban is the standard traditional uniform dress for men, consisting of a tunic shirt, pants, and with (optional) head covering. This dress originates from the Pashtun lands but its use spread to most of Afghanistan. It remains the predominant dress for male villagers. Some of the more famous varieties are the Kandahari Doozi and Herati Doozi styles.  On the head is normally a turban (lungi): they are worn all over the country, but the fabric, color and style varies region by region. For example, an Uzbek hat from the north of the country is distinct from a Pashtun hat worn in the south.

From a young age, boys often wear colorful caps with shiny "chips" of mirrors sewn into them.

The karakul hat is made of sheep fur and is of typical Central Asian style. Normally worn by the more stylish or educated, these hats come in conservative colors. The chapan coat is another cloth of Central Asian origin that provides warmth in the winter, made of striped silk. The chapan gained international recognition in the 2000s when Afghan president Hamid Karzai always wore a green one.

Women's clothing
Traditional women's dresses are always long and are made from light linens and are loose fitting for ease of movement. They come in many colors and have stitching for details. Most traditional clothing are colorful, except for the Nuristan dress. More elaborate and fancier dresses are detailed with gold threading (Zardozi), gold beads, and come in many different colors on silk fabrics. These dresses are usually worn to special occasions and weddings.

They are usually of heavy design and filled with small mirrors around the chest area, along with long and pleated skirts.

Most Afghans are Muslim and virtually all Afghan women wear a head covering based on the local interpretation of religious laws. Most women wear a hijab or chador as a covering. Some wear a chadari, better known in the West as burqa.

In a few places like Kabul, Western dresses like jeans are often worn. From the 1960s to 1990s, more liberal forms of female dress like miniskirts were popular among some communities in Kabul.

Culture and society
Clothes are usually stitched by hand. Girls start learning embroidery from an early age and skills are normally passed down from mothers to daughters. Each dress created by a woman can be seen as a unique piece of art.

Certain attire have special significance, for example in some Pashtun or Baloch cultures in southern Afghanistan, a boy marks his start of adulthood by being allowed to wear a turban.

Politics
The clothing of Afghanistan gained wide attention in the Western world following the U.S. invasion and fall of the Taliban regime, under which ultraconservative dress like the burqa was made compulsory. Especially, Hamid Karzai gained popularity for his creative style blending various attire of Afghanistan. In September 2021, Afghan women launched an online campaign protesting against the Taliban's strict dress code after the militants took power.

Also notably, a photo taken in Kabul in 1972 showing local women in miniskirts was reportedly shown to then-President Donald Trump of the United States by H. R. McMaster, which persuaded Trump to keep American toops in Afghanistan.

Western and hippie appeal

Sheepskin Afghan coats became popular in the Western world during the late 1960s; John Lennon famously wore one during the launch of his band's Sgt. Pepper's Lonely Hearts Club Band album in London. The Afghan coat became a popular dress in the hippie subculture Afghanistan itself was on the hippie trail and such coats were often bought by foreigners in Kabul's Chicken Street.

See also

Pashtun clothing
Khet partug
Firaq partug
Hazara clothing

References

 
History of Asian clothing
Afghan culture
Pashtun culture

vi:Trang phục Afghanistan